GD2 is a disialoganglioside expressed on tumors of neuroectodermal origin, including human neuroblastoma and melanoma, with highly restricted expression on normal tissues, principally to the cerebellum and peripheral nerves in humans.

The relatively tumor-specific expression of GD2 makes it a suitable target for immunotherapy with monoclonal antibodies or with artificial T cell receptors. An example of such antibodies is hu14.18K322A, a monoclonal antibody. This anti-GD2 antibody is currently undergoing a phase II clinical trial in the treatment of previously untreated high risk neuroblastoma given alongside combination chemotherapy prior to stem cell transplant and radiation therapy. A prior phase I clinical trial for patients with refractory or recurrent neuroblastoma designed to decrease toxicity found safe dosage amounts and determined that common toxicities, particularly pain, could be well managed. The chimeric (murine-human) anti-GD2 monoclonal antibody ch14.18 is FDA-approved for the treatment of pediatric patients with high-risk neuroblastoma and has been studied in patients with other GD2-expressing tumors.

See also
 3F8

References

Further reading

Glycolipids